Thomas Gustav Winner (3 May 1917, Prague – 20 April 2004, Cambridge, Massachusetts) was an American slavist and semiotician.

At Brown University, he established the first American semiotics center.

He was a well-known Chekhov  specialist, and a proponent of Tartu-Moscow semiotics school.

Notes

1917 births
2004 deaths
American semioticians
Slavists
Writers from Prague
Brown University faculty
Czechoslovak emigrants to the United States
Presidents of the Semiotic Society of America